Dimethylglycine N-methyltransferase (BsmB, DMT) is an enzyme with systematic name S-adenosyl-L-methionine:N,N-dimethylglycine N-methyltransferase (betaine-forming). This enzyme catalyses the following chemical reaction

 S-adenosyl-L-methionine + N,N-dimethylglycine  S-adenosyl-L-homocysteine + betaine

This enzyme is purified from the marine cyanobacterium Synechococcus sp. WH8102.

References

External links 
 

EC 2.1.1